Hart's Location is a town in Carroll County, New Hampshire, United States. Since 1948, the town has been one of the first places to declare its results for the New Hampshire presidential primary and U.S. presidential elections.

The population was 68 as of the 2020 census. It was incorporated in 1795. Hart's Location receives services from the nearby town of Bartlett, but otherwise has its own government, selectmen and post office. Home to Crawford Notch State Park, which is noted for its rugged mountain beauty, the town is crossed by the Appalachian Trail.

History

Hart's Location was named after Colonel John Hart of Portsmouth, New Hampshire. In 1772, the land was granted to Thomas Chadbourne, also of Portsmouth. Native Americans used a trail up the Saco River valley through Crawford Notch, and during the French and Indian Wars, many English captives were taken to Canada that way. Despite this, the pass through the White Mountains was otherwise unknown until 1771, when Timothy Nash discovered it hunting moose, and told Governor John Wentworth.

The obscure Indian trail transformed into the Coös Road, on which was built a small public house in 1793. It was abandoned, but in 1825 Samuel Willey Jr. occupied it with his wife, five children, and two hired hands. During a violent storm on August 28, 1826, they all died in a landslide known as Willey's Slide. They fled their home and took refuge in a shelter, but it was destroyed while the house remained unscathed. A rock outcrop uphill divided the slide, which flowed around the home and reunited below it. The door was found gaping, a bible open on the table. Their tragedy inspired the short story "The Ambitious Guest" (1835) by Nathaniel Hawthorne, and Mount Willey was named in their memory. The house became part of a larger inn, then burned in 1898. Today, the location is a state historic site.

In 1875, the Portland and Ogdensburg Railroad completed its line up through Crawford Notch. Later part of the Mountain Division of the Maine Central Railroad, the route is still traveled by the Conway Scenic Railroad.

Geography

This anomaly is heightened on maps that show county lines: Coos County lies immediately to the east and Grafton County to the west, but Hart's Location is part of Carroll County, though barely connected to it.

Arethusa Falls, New Hampshire's highest waterfall, located in the neighboring township of Livermore, is a popular hiking destination with access from U.S. Route 302 in Hart's Location. The town lies fully within the Saco River watershed.

The town is a popular ice climbing destination in the winter months.

Demographics

As of the census of 2000, there were 37 people, 15 households, and 10 families residing in the location. The population density was 2.0 people per square mile (0.8/km2). There were 50 housing units at an average density of 2.7 per square mile (1.0/km2). The racial makeup of the location was 97.30% (36 people) White, with 2.70% (one person) citing themselves as from two or more races.

There were 15 households, out of which 33.3% had children under the age of 18 living with them, 66.7% were married couples living together, and 33.3% were non-families. 26.7% of all households were made up of individuals, and 6.7% had someone living alone who was 65 years of age or older. The average household size was 2.47 and the average family size was 3.10.

In the location the age distribution of the population shows 24.3% under the age of 18, 5.4% from 18 to 24, 35.1% from 25 to 44, 8.1% from 45 to 64, and 27.0% who were 65 years of age or older. The median age was 39 years. For every 100 females, there were 94.7 males. For every 100 females age 18 and over, there were 100.0 males.

The median income for a household in the location was $41,250, and the median income for a family was $70,833. Males had a median income of $26,250 versus $28,750 for females. The per capita income for the town was $19,609. None of the population and none of the families were below the poverty line.

Politics

Federal elections 

New Hampshire law allows towns with fewer than 100 residents to open the polls at midnight and close them as soon as all registered voters have cast their ballots.   Hart's Location is one of the New Hampshire communities where the first votes are cast in the Democratic and Republican New Hampshire primaries, the first presidential primaries in the United States during each presidential election year. The Hart's Location midnight voting tradition, which began in 1948, actually predates the more widely known Dixville Notch practice; however, Dixville Notch generally receives greater publicity.

Election results

Boldfaced names indicate the ultimate nationwide winner of each contest:

1996

2000

2004

2008

2012

2016

2020

In popular culture 
The community's voting tradition received a nod in the 2002 third-season episode of US television program The West Wing, in an episode entitled "Hartsfield's Landing", named after a town modeled on either Hart's Location, or its companion, Dixville Notch.

See also

 White Mountain art
 Dixville Notch, New Hampshire
 New Hampshire Historical Marker No. 186: Sawyer's Rock
 New Hampshire Historical Marker No. 213: Frankenstein Trestle

References

External links
 
 New Hampshire Economic and Labor Market Information Bureau Profile

Towns in Carroll County, New Hampshire
Populated places established in 2001
Towns in New Hampshire